Miss Burma was the national beauty pageant in Burma (now Myanmar) from 1947 to 1962. The winner of Miss Burma also represented her country at the Miss Universe.

In 1962, the pageant was banned by the Union Revolutionary Council government because it was considered against Burmese culture.

History
The term Miss Burma was introduced in Myanmar through the MISS ORGANIZATION and held the Miss Burma 1959 Local Beauty Pageant Competition. At the end of the event, Than Than Aye was competed in Miss Burma 1959. She was the 
Burma's first contestant in the Miss Universe pageant.

In 1960, the Miss Burma Organization competed for Burma beauty pageants to Big Four international beauty pageants. That year, Myint Myint May competed in Miss Universe 1960 and received the Miss Congeniality Award, a Special Award and Ma Sen Aye competed in Miss World 1960. After that year, Khin Myint Myint won the Miss Burma beauty pageant and represented her country at the Miss Universe 1961 event held at Miami Beach, Florida and Manie Pu also completed in Miss International 1961. In 1962, the Miss Burma was the golden era of the Myanmar. But, the Burmese government abolished the Miss Burma pageant because they thought it was against the Burmese culture.

Titleholders
The winner of Miss Burma also represented her country at the Miss Universe competition.

Runner-Up

Major International competitions

Miss Universe

Miss World

Miss International

Winner Gallery

See also
 Miss Universe Myanmar
 Miss World Myanmar
 Miss International Myanmar
 Miss Earth Myanmar
 Miss Supranational Myanmar
 Miss Grand Myanmar
 Mister Myanmar

References

External links

Burmese awards
 
Beauty pageants in Myanmar